Mazen "Maz" Trakh (born July 3, 1962) is a Jordanian-American professional basketball coach. He has coached in the National Basketball Association (NBA), Continental Basketball Association (CBA), American Basketball Association (ABA) and overseas.

Playing career
Trakh attended La Quinta High School in Westminster, California, where he was a teammate on the basketball team with Johnny Rogers. He played college basketball for the Southern Utah Thunderbirds from 1983 to 1986.

Coaching career
Trakh served as an assistant coach at Riverside Community College from 1989 to 1993 and for the UC Irvine Anteaters from 1994 to 1996.

Trakh helped lead Jordanian club Fastlink to the 2006 FIBA Asia Club Championship. His team became the first Jordanian team to ever win the championship.

NBA 
Trakh began working with the Oklahoma City Thunder prior to the 2010–11 season, serving as the assistant coach focusing on player development for three seasons.

Trakh was an assistant coach for the Detroit Pistons during the 2013–14 season under coach Maurice Cheeks.

Trakh served as the west coast advance scout for the Golden State Warriors during the 2015–16 season.

At the beginning of the 2016–17 season, the Washington Wizards added Trakh to their coaching staff as assistant coach.

Personal life
Trakh's older brother Mark is also a basketball coach.

See also
 List of foreign NBA coaches

References

External links 
Coach information at Basketball-reference.com

1960 births
Living people
American emigrants to Jordan
American expatriate basketball people in South Korea
American people of Jordanian descent
Basketball coaches from California
Basketball players from California
Continental Basketball Association coaches
Detroit Pistons assistant coaches
Golden State Warriors scouts
Oklahoma City Thunder assistant coaches
People from Westminster, California
Southern Utah Thunderbirds men's basketball players
Washington Wizards assistant coaches